Universal Music Africa (UMA) is a multilingual music corporation of the global record label Universal Music Group, covering 25 French, Spanish, and Portuguese-speaking countries, in Africa, with its corporate headquarters located in Abidjan, Côte d'Ivoire. Universal Music Africa is known for housing Motown Gospel Africa, Blue Note Records Africa, and Def Jam Recordings Africa.

History
Universal Music Africa was founded on 11 July 2018, as the largest African division of Universal Music Group, operating in Cote d'Ivoire, Cameroon,  Nigeria, Senegal, Benin, Burkina Faso, Burundi, Cabo Verde, Central African Republic, Chad, Comoros, Congo, Djibouti, Equatorial Guinea, Gabon, Guinea, Guinea-Bissau, Madagascar, Mali, Niger, Sao Tome and Principe, Senegal, Seychelles, Togo, and South Africa. In 2018, Universal Music Group, appoints Moussa Soumbounou, as the managing director, and Olivier Nusse, the CEO of Universal Music France, was appointed as the veteran executive, artist manager, and live promoter.

Following the launch, Universal Music Africa (marketed as Universal Music Group Africa), kicked off with Kiff No Beat, DJ Arafat, Toofan, Locko, and Ténor, as its first recording artist. On 11 April 2018, Mr Eazi Banku Music, signed a licensing deal with Universal Music Group Africa, in conjunction with Universal Music South Africa, to distribute Life Is Eazi, Vol. 2 - Lagos to London in Africa. On 17 June 2019, Charlotte Dipanda, Mink's, Magasco, Pit Baccardi, and Mimie, joins Universal Music Group Africa artist roaster.

On 30 August 2019, Yemi Alade, released her fourth studio album Woman of Steel, through Universal Music Africa, and Effyzzie Music Group. On September 9, 2019, she signed a licensing deal with Universal Music Africa, in partnership with Universal Music France. On 13 January 2020, Universal Music Group, promotes Franck-Alcide Kacou, as the general manager of Universal Music Group Africa. On 16 May 2020, UMA, host The Africa at Home, virtual concert, with guess performances from Yemi Alade, Magic System, Serge Beynaud, Vegedream, Kiff No Beat, Fally Ipupa, Singuila, Hiro, Toofan, Locko, Didier Awadi, Salif Keita, Angélique Kidjo, and Patience Dabany.

On 4 January 2021, UMG appoints its key Executive in Africa. Sipho Dlamini, and Elouise Kelly was named CEO and COO of Sub-Saharan Africa, and Universal Music South Africa, while Sipho Dlamini continues to report to Adam Granite, UMG's EVP, Market Development, to identify further opportunities for artists signed to Universal Music Africa, and continues to oversee all of UMG's operations within English-speaking Africa countries. Chinedu Okeke was named managing director of Universal Music Group Nigeria.

U-Live Africa
In 2018, UMA launched U-Live Africa, a flagship of U-Live, and a division of UMG. U-Live Africa is an event promoter, producer, and investor in live entertainment in Africa. On 5 October 2018, Major Lazer "Soundsystem Live tour Africa tour" in Nigeria, was produced by U-Live Africa, at Hard Rock Beach, Victoria Island, Lagos. In 2018, Adekunle Gold’s three-night residency at Terra Kulture, from 13 to 15th December. On 17 July 2020, Fally Ipupa partnered with U-Live Africa. According to Fally Ipupa "this announcement is accompanied by an African tour from November 2020 to January 2021. A dozen dates are planned between Ivory Coast, Cameroon, Gabon, and Liberia at the top of the list".

Blue Note Africa
On 6 April 2022, Blue Note Records, and Universal Music Group Africa, established Blue Note Africa (marketed as Blue Note Records Africa), to sign Jazz artists from across the African continent. According to UMA, CEO, Sipho Dlamini, "The opportunity to create Blue Note Africa and provide a channel for African Jazz talent to have a home in the U.S., with a dedicated and passionate team led by a legend in his own right – Don Was, is very exciting. We can now walk the African Jazz journey, from Cape to Cairo to California".

Partnerships

Boomplay Music
On 5 November 2018, Universal Music Group announced a multi-year distribution deal with Boomplay, an African music digital download and streaming service, in ten Africa countries. On 17 March 2021, Universal Music Group signed an expanded licensing deal to enable Boomplay Music to stream Universal Music Africa's music catalog.

ONOMO Hotels Group
On 2 December 2020, ONOMO Hotels Group, signed a strategic partnership with Universal Music Africa, in conjunction with ONOMO Africa's Finest Live, an initiative to promote and support African arts, African music, and African cuisine. Right after the government announced that entertainment, events, exhibitions and cultural shows will resume in line with COVID-19 preventive measures, on 10 December 2020, Onomo hotel launched a new restaurant and lounge called "iJURU", with live music curated by Universal Music Africa.

Tallac Records
On 13 July 2021, Booba "Tallac Records", signed a strategic partnership with Universal Music Africa. According to Universal Music Africa, the exclusive deal will see Booba's entire catalog, spanning 10 albums and almost two decades, available for the first time across the continent and will also include future releases. The deal also marks the launch of 92i Africa, a new division of Booba "92 I brand", in partnership with Universal Music Africa (UMA) and Universal Music France (UMF).

TBI Publishing S.A.
On 12 October 2021, Youssou N'Dour "TBI Publishing S.A.", signed a multi-year, exclusive partnership with UMA. According to Franck Kacou, "His incomparable voice is a strong symbol of the direction we have taken over the past couple of years with UMA, establishing the company as a true home for African artists and music, and a bridge to audiences around the world through our network of labels". According to UMG, "The partnership will begin with the surprise release of a new album on November 12th, 2021".

Artists
Recording artists, and producers, signed to Universal Music Africa includes:

Locko
Rophnan
Ténor
DJ Arafat
Singuila
Vegedream
Dena Mwana
Toofan
Youssou N'Dour
Yemi Alade
Booba
Sauti Sol
Charlotte Dipanda
Magic System
Mink's
Magasco
Pit Baccardi
Mimie
Kiff No Beat
Mr Eazi
Zainhy(99Loner)

Selected discography

Singles

Albums & EPs

References

2018 establishments in Ivory Coast
Universal Music Group
2018 establishments in Africa